The Politics of Basilicata (Basilicata, Italy), takes place in a framework of a presidential representative democracy, whereby the President of Regional Government is the head of government, and of a pluriform multi-party system. Executive power is exercised by the Regional Government. Legislative power is vested in both the government and the Regional Council.

Executive branch
The Regional Government (Giunta Regionale) is presided by the President of the Region (Presidente della Regione), who is elected for a five-year term, and is composed by the President and the Ministers (Assessori), who are currently 6, including a vice president.

List of presidents

Legislative branch

The Regional Council of Basilicata (Consiglio Regionale della Basilicata) is composed of 30 members. 24 councillors are elected in provincial constituencies by proportional representation using the largest remainder method with a Droop quota and open lists, while 6 councillors (elected in bloc) come from a "regional list", including the President-elect. One seat is reserved for the candidate who comes second. If a coalition wins more than 50% of the total seats in the council with PR, only 3 candidates from the regional list will be chosen and the number of those elected in provincial constituencies will be 26. If the winning coalition receives less than 40% of votes special seats are added to the council to ensure a large majority for the President's coalition.

The council is elected for a five-year term, but, if the President suffers a vote of no confidence, resigns or dies, under the simul stabunt, simul cadent clause introduced in 1999 (literally they will stand together or they will fall together), also the council is dissolved and a snap election is called.

Local government

Provinces

Municipalities

Provincial capitals

Parties and elections

Latest regional election

In the latest regional election, which took place on 24 March 2019, Vito Bardi of Forza Italia was elected president, ending 24 years of dominance by the centre-left coalition. The League, which fielded candidates for the first time in the region, was the largest party.

References

External links
Regional Government of Basilicata
Regional Council of Basilicata
Constitution of Basilicata